Rachel Trixie Anne Gardner, Baroness Gardner of Parkes,  (née McGirr; born ) is an Australian-born dentist and Conservative member of the British House of Lords. She was the first Australian woman to have been elevated to the peerage, and as of 2023 is the most senior Life peer in the House of Lords.

Biography

Early life and education 
Baroness Gardner was born in Parkes, New South Wales, the daughter of Greg McGirr, a former leader of the New South Wales Labor Party. She earned a Bachelor of Dental Surgery (BDS) in 1954 from the University of Sydney, where she was a resident at Sancta Sophia College, and studied in Paris at Le Cordon Bleu. She moved to the UK in 1957.

Politics 
Gardner was a councillor of Westminster City Council from 1968 to 1978 and was Lady Mayoress (when her husband was Lord Mayor) during 1987–88. In 1970, she stood for Parliament for the Conservative Party against Labour's Barbara Castle in Blackburn, and in February 1974 stood against the Liberal John Pardoe in North Cornwall. In 1971, she was made a Justice of the Peace. In addition, she was elected as a member of the Greater London Council (GLC) representing Havering (1970-1973) and Enfield Southgate (1977–1986) until the GLC's abolition. She held various directorships and was the UK Representative on the United Nations Status of Women Commission 1982–1988.

On 19 June 1981, Gardner was created a life peeress of the United Kingdom as Baroness Gardner of Parkes, of Southgate in Greater London, and of Parkes in the Australian state of New South Wales and Commonwealth of Australia. She was ennobled for her two decades of community and local government work as a Conservative, the first Australian woman to be so honoured. On 4 April 2007, she was made an Honorary Fellow of the University of Sydney.

Background 
Baroness Gardner can trace her roots back to Ireland via her grandfather, John McGirr, a native of Moneen, Louisburg, County Mayo, who married Mary O'Sullivan from North Cork. Their son was Gardner's father, Gregory, who led the New South Wales Labor Party from March to July 1923. An uncle, James McGirr, was also in Labor politics, serving as Premier of New South Wales from 1947 to 1952. A nephew, Dr Jack McGirr, is a dentist in Lane Cove, a Sydney suburb, and is a former Mayor of Lane Cove Council.

Family
Her husband, Kevin Gardner (1930–2007), was also a native of Australia. He was educated at Waverley College and won a scholarship to the University of Sydney to study dentistry, winning the Arnott Prize for oral surgery in 1954. He spent a year on the university teaching staff at the Sydney Dental Hospital before going to London in 1955. He married Trixie McGirr in 1956 in Paris, and they set up their home in London.

In May 1982, the year after she joined the House of Lords, Kevin was elected to Westminster City Council, where Trixie had been a councillor since 1968. He was the first Australian to be the Lord Mayor of Westminster. He was re-elected as a councillor in 2006 at age 75. Kevin Gardner died the following year, in 2007. The couple had three daughters: Joanna, Rachel and Sarah. Joanna was Mayor (2008–09) of the Royal Borough of Kensington and Chelsea, London. The Gardner family is devoutly Catholic.

Arms

References

Bibliography
 They Work For You: UK Parliament voting, speaking search engine
 
 

1927 births
Living people
Australian expatriates in England
Life peeresses created by Elizabeth II
Australian life peers
Conservative Party (UK) life peers
Australian dentists
Australian Roman Catholics
Australian people of Irish descent
People from New South Wales
Members of the Greater London Council
Conservative Party (UK) parliamentary candidates
Women councillors in England
Conservative Party (UK) councillors
Councillors in the City of Westminster